Teletambores is a community television station on channel 40 in the municipality of Francisco Linares Alcantara Municipality, Aragua State, Venezuela.

History
A concession was received to legally operate in May 2002.

See also
List of Venezuelan television channels

References

Television stations in Venezuela
2000 establishments in Venezuela
Television in Venezuela
Spanish-language television stations
Aragua